Mount Kruzenshtern is a peak in Severny Island, Novaya Zemlya, Arkhangelsk Oblast, Russia. It rises inland near the northwestern shore and is the highest point of Arkhangelsk Oblast.

The mountain was first put on the map in the 1820s by Arctic explorer Fyodor Litke (1797–1882) following his Novaya Zemlya explorations. It was named after Russian Navy Admiral Ivan Kruzenshtern (1770–1846). The mountain's name must have been known to Soviet topographers, but for undisclosed reasons it was omitted in USSR maps printed in mid 20th century.

Description
It is an ultra-prominent peak that rises on the western edge of the Severny Island ice cap, north of the head of the Glazov Glacier.

See also
List of highest points of Russian federal subjects
List of mountains and hills of Russia
List of European ultra-prominent peaks
Most isolated major summits of Europe

References

External links

Ivan Kruzenshtern - the famous Russian navigator

Kruzenshtern
Kruzenshtern
Novaya Zemlya